Many sex scandals in American history have involved incumbent United States federal elected politicians, as well as persons appointed with the consent of the United States Senate. Sometimes, the officials have denied the accusations, have apologized, or have lost their office in consequence of the scandal (e.g. by resigning, being defeated, or deciding not to run again).

This list is ordered chronologically. There is some emphasis on sex scandals since the mid-1970s, because  the media was less inclined to cover these matters before then. Additionally, outing people because of perceptions that their political positions are anti-gay has become increasingly common since 1989. More generally, any perceived inconsistency between personal conduct and policy positions makes a politician's sex life more likely to become publicized.

For these listed people, either the scandal, or the behavior which gave rise to it, occurred while they were occupying their high federal offices, and one or the other date may be used here, even if coverage of the scandal was entirely posthumous. Politicians' sex crimes are not covered in this particular list, regardless of whether there has been a verdict yet.

Definitions
One of the definitions of sex is "physical activity in which people touch each other's bodies, kiss each other, etc." Thus, instances or accusations of sexism, homophobia, or exhibitionism that do not include or seek that sort of physical activity are not covered by this list.

Scandal is defined as: “loss of or damage to reputation caused by actual, accused, or apparent violation of morality or propriety.” Scandal is not the same as controversy, which implies two differing points of view, and is also not the same as unpopularity. Misunderstandings, breaches of ethics, or cover-ups may or may not result in scandals depending on the amount of publicity generated, and the seriousness of the alleged behavior.

1776–1899
 Alexander Hamilton (Federalist Party), Secretary of the Treasury—Hamilton had an affair with Maria Reynolds while both were married to other people (see Hamilton-Reynolds sex scandal). Reynolds' husband blackmailed Hamilton, who paid to maintain secrecy. In 1797, when Hamilton no longer held the post of Treasury Secretary, the affair was publicized by journalist James Callender, after which Hamilton publicly apologized. Said Hamilton: “This confession is not made without a blush.... I can never cease to condemn myself for the pang which it may inflict in a bosom eminently entitled to all my gratitude, fidelity, and love.” (1796)
 Thomas Jefferson (Democratic-Republican-Virginia), President — was publicly accused of fathering the children of an enslaved woman, Sally Hemings, by journalist James Callender (who had also publicized Alexander Hamilton's affair) in the Jefferson–Hemings controversy. Hemings was the half-sister of Jefferson's late wife Martha, and based partly upon DNA evidence, there is now a scholarly consensus that either a relative of Thomas Jefferson or Thomas Jefferson himself fathered several of Sally Hemings' children. In January 2000, a Thomas Jefferson Foundation research committee concluded that all the known evidence indicated with high probability that Thomas Jefferson was the father of Eston Hemings, and that he was also likely the father of all six of Sally Hemings's children listed in Monticello records. A later report from a Thomas Jefferson Heritage Society committee differed and came to the conclusion that "Randolph" (presumably Thomas Jefferson Randolph, Jefferson's grandson; he was known to have been invited to visit Monticello around the time of Eston's conception, but no record of an actual visit has been found) is more likely the father, or possibly that one of Jefferson's Carr nephews is the father. (1802)
 Andrew Jackson (Democrat-Tennessee), U.S. Congressman, U.S. Senator, territorial (or military) governor (appointed) of Florida, and later President of the United States — had married Rachel Donelson Jackson in 1791. Both of them believed her divorce from her abusive, alcoholic first husband, Lewis Robards, was final. However, Robards had never completed his paperwork, rendering Jackson and Rachel's 1791 marriage void; and the couple married again in 1794. Throughout his later career, opponents of Jackson portrayed Rachel as a bigamist. Shortly after he was elected president in 1828 (but before the inauguration), Rachel suffered a nervous collapse and died. Jackson blamed this on the bigamy charges during the campaign, and he was bereft at the loss of his wife. (1828)
 Richard Mentor Johnson, Senator (Democrat-Kentucky) — did not attempt to hide his relationship with a enslaved woman named Julia Chinn, which caused his own party to distance themselves from him, and contributed to his failed Senate re-election bid in 1828. Though they were prohibited from marrying, Johnson treated her as his common-law wife, and they had children. She died in 1833, before he became vice-president under Martin Van Buren.
 John Henry Eaton (Democrat), Secretary of War —  allegedly had an affair with Margaret O'Neill Timberlake, the wife of John B. Timberlake, which allegedly drove Timberlake to suicide (see Petticoat Affair). Eaton then married the widow, Peggy, which led to social and political difficulties during the administration of President Andrew Jackson.
 James Henry Hammond (Nullifier Party-South Carolina), U.S. Representative and later Senator — engaged in a homosexual relationship with a college friend, pursued what he called "a little dalliance" with his teenage nieces, and had sexual relationships with enslaved females—including a girl aged 12.  The affair with his nieces became public in 1843, and forced Hammond to withdraw from his Senate bid in 1846, but he later became a U.S. Senator again in 1857.
 Daniel Webster, U.S. Senator (Whig-Massachusetts) — was the subject of accusations by a reporter, Jane Grey Swisshelm, in May 1850, while he was married and still serving in Congress: “His mistresses are generally, if not always, colored women—some of them big black wenches as ugly and vulgar as himself.” The national press widely copied the charges of infidelity, which are at least partly corroborated by other sources. (1850)
 James Buchanan (Democrat), U.S. Senator, diplomat, later President of the United States, and William Rufus King (Democrat-Alabama), who served as vice-president under Franklin Pierce, and who died in 1853 before Buchanan became president, were the subject of scandalous gossip alleging a homosexual affair in Washington, D.C., for many years. Andrew Jackson referred to King as “Miss Nancy.” (1850s)
 Philip Barton Key II, the United States Attorney for the District of Columbia and son of Francis Scott Key — had a public affair with Teresa Bagioli Sickles, the wife of U.S. Congressman (and later Civil War Major General) Daniel Sickles (himself a public serial adulterer), who gunned him down in broad daylight in Lafayette Square in 1859.  Sickles was acquitted of murder after the first successful temporary insanity defense in the United States, put forward by his attorneys James T. Brady, John Graham, and  Edwin Stanton (later Lincoln's Secretary of War).
 Grover Cleveland, President (Democrat-New York) — During the 1884 presidential race, the news broke that Cleveland had paid child support to the widowed Maria Crofts Halpin for her son, Oscar Folsom Cleveland, born in 1874. Halpin accused Cleveland of raping her, leading to her pregnancy, and she also accused him of later institutionalizing her against her will to gain control of their child. Cleveland's acknowledgement of Oscar's paternity ameliorated the political situation, but the controversy prompted Cleveland's opponents to adopt the chant, “Ma, ma, where's my pa?” After Cleveland won the election, the chant was answered by, “Gone to the White House, ha, ha, ha!” (1884)
 William Campbell Preston Breckinridge, Representative (Democrat-Kentucky) — Former mistress Madeleine Pollard sued Breckinridge for breach of promise after his wife died, and he failed to marry Pollard as promised. The congressman was not reelected. (1894) 
 George Q. Cannon (Republican), Utah Territorial Delegate — was refused his seat in the Congress due to his arrest for Unlawful Cohabitation (polygamy). He served nearly six months in penitentiary. (1888)

1900–1969
 Arthur Brown (Republican-Utah), a U.S. Senator, and founder of the Utah State Republican Party — was shot dead by his longtime mistress, Anne Maddison Bradley, for having a second mistress. Bradley, who had two children by Brown, was tried, but acquitted on a defense of temporary insanity. (1906)
 Woodrow Wilson, President (Democrat) — allegedly had an affair with Mary Allen Hulbert, whom he met in 1907 when he was president of Princeton University.
 Warren G. Harding, President (Republican) — reportedly had affairs with Carrie Phillips and Nan Britton during the 1910s and early 1920s, prior to his death in 1923. Britton claimed in a best-selling 1927 book, The President's Daughter, that her daughter had been fathered by Harding while he was a U.S. senator. Her assertion was finally established as factual in August 2015, when genetic tests confirmed Harding as the father of Elizabeth.
 David I. Walsh, Senator (Democrat-Massachusetts) — was accused of visiting a male brothel in Brooklyn frequented by Nazi spies in 1942.
 Franklin D. Roosevelt, President (Democrat) — had multiple extra-marital affairs beginning in 1914, and continued until he died in 1945.
 Styles Bridges, US Senator (Republican-New Hampshire) — during the Lavender Scare of the 1950s, threatened to expose the son of US Senator Lester Hunt (Democrat-Wyoming) as a homosexual, unless Hunt resigned from the Senate, which would give the Republicans a Senate majority. Hunt refused, but did not seek re-election, and later shot himself (1954).
 John F. Kennedy, President (Democrat-Massachusetts) — has been linked to many extramarital affairs, including allegations of involvement with Marilyn Monroe and Judith Campbell Exner. He engaged in an affair with intern Mimi Alford during the period 1962–1963.
 Lyndon B. Johnson, President (Democrat-Texas) — had extramarital affairs with multiple women over the years, in particular with Alice Marsh (née Glass), who assisted him politically. One such affair with Madeleine Duncan Brown allegedly led to her pregnancy with a son out of that relationship. 
 William O. Douglas, U.S. Supreme Court Justice (Democrat) — allegedly pursued other women while married to his third wife, which, combined with his three divorces and remarriages, was considered scandalous. He also reportedly tried to molest a flight attendant in his judicial chambers. Attempted impeachment based upon his moral character failed, when the House Judiciary Committee found insufficient grounds for impeachment. (1960s)

1970–1979
 Wilbur Mills, Representative (Democrat-Arkansas) — was found intoxicated with stripper Fanne Foxe. He was re-elected, but resigned  in 1974 after giving an intoxicated press conference from Foxe's burlesque house dressing room.
 Allan Howe, Representative (Democrat-Utah) — was arrested in 1976 for soliciting two police officers posing as prostitutes.
 Wayne Hays, Representative (Democrat-Ohio) — The Elizabeth Ray sex scandal ended his career in 1976. The Washington Post reported that Ray had been on the payroll of a committee run by Hays for two years as a clerk-secretary. During that time, she admitted, her actual job duties were providing Congressman Hays sexual favors: “I can't type, I can't file, I can't even answer the phone.”
 Fred Richmond, Representative (Democrat-New York) — In 1978, charges that he solicited sex from a 16-year-old boy were dropped after he submitted to counseling.
 Robert L. Leggett, Representative (Democrat-California) — acknowledged that he fathered two illegitimate children by a Congressional secretary, whom he supported financially. He then had an affair with another woman, who was an aide to Speaker Carl Albert (1976).
 Joseph P. Wyatt, Jr., Representative (Democrat-Texas) — was arrested on charges of homosexual offenses in 1979.
 John Andrew Young, Representative (Democrat-Texas) — A female staffer alleged she was forced to have sex with Young in order to keep her job. Young referred to the charge as “poppycock", though his wife committed suicide the following year.  Though he ran again, he lost his next primary election. (1976)

1980–1989
 Donald "Buz" Lukens Representative (Republican-Ohio) — Convicted of Contributing to the Delinquency of a Minor for having sex with a 16-year-old girl. He was sentenced to 30 days in jail, and fined $500 in 1989.
 Robert Bauman, Representative (Republican-Maryland) — was charged with attempting to solicit sex from a 16-year-old male prostitute. Upon completing an alcoholism rehabilitation program, the charges were dropped. Bauman apologized to voters for his indiscretions,  but was defeated for re-election in 1980.
 Jon Hinson, Representative (Republican-Mississippi) — Resigned in 1981 after being charged with attempted sodomy for performing oral sex on a male employee of the Library of Congress. (1981)
 Thomas Evans, Representative (Republican-Delaware) — Went golfing in Florida with nude model and lobbyist Paula Parkinson, who later suggested her lobbying techniques had been “unusually tactile.” Though Evans apologized for any appearance of impropriety, he was voted out of office in 1982. Future Vice-President Dan Quayle and Congressman Tom Railsback went on the golf trip as well, but were not implicated in the sex. Marilyn Quayle said it was common knowledge that her husband would "rather play golf than have sex any day." (1981)
 John G. Schmitz, Representative (Republican-California) — Leader of the ultra-conservative John Birch Society; admitted to having a second family, but refused to accept or support the two children he produced, who became wards of the state (1982). The story would again gain international attention in 1997, when his daughter, Mary Kay Letourneau, was convicted of raping and getting impregnated twice by a 12-year-old boy, whom she taught. 
 Dan Crane, Representative, (Republican-Illinois) — was censured July 20, 1983, in the Congressional Page sex scandal for having sex with a 17-year-old congressional page.
 Gerry Studds, Representative (Democrat-Massachusetts) — was censured July 20, 1983, in the Congressional Page sex scandal for having sex with a 17-year-old congressional page (1983).
 Gary Hart, Senator (Democrat-Colorado) — was the front-runner for the Democratic nomination in the 1988 presidential elections. He was photographed with model Donna Rice on a boat named “Monkey Business” during a trip to the Bahamas, raising questions of infidelity. His popularity plummeted, and he soon dropped out. (1987). Thirty years later, it was alleged that the photo had been staged in a set-up, orchestrated by the rival campaign of then-Vice President George H. W. Bush.
 Ernie Konnyu, Representative (Republican-California) — Konnyu was accused of sexual harassment. He had asked a female aide to move a name tag she was wearing, because it drew attention to her breasts, about which he later said: “She is not exactly heavily stacked, OK?” In another instance, he reportedly touched the knee of lobbyist Polly Minor during lunch, which caused a scene. GOP leaders were unhappy with Konnyu's temperament anyway, so they found Stanford professor Tom Campbell, who ousted Konnyu the following June. (1987)
 Barney Frank, Representative (Democrat-Massachusetts) — In 1989, was reprimanded by the House for “fixing” 33 parking tickets for Steve Gobie, a male escort who lived with Frank, and claimed to have conducted an escort service from Frank's apartment without his knowledge.
 Gus Savage, Representative (Democrat-Illinois) — In 1989, was accused of trying to force himself on a female Peace Corps worker while in Zaire. No action was taken by the House Ethics Committee after he apologized to her.

1990–1999
 Arlan Stangeland, U.S. House of Representatives (1977–1991), (Republican-Minnesota) — Lost his campaign for re-election in 1990, largely because of a scandal, having made several hundred long-distance phone calls on his House credit card to a female lobbyist in Virginia. He admitted that he had made the calls, but denied having a romantic relationship with the woman. After his loss, he subsequently retired from politics.
 Austin J. Murphy, Representative (Democrat-Pennsylvania) — In 1994, acknowledged fathering a child out of wedlock, after a political opponent came forward with video of Murphy leaving the home of his mistress. (1990)
 Charles S. Robb, Senator (Democrat-Virginia) — while married to Lynda Bird Johnson, Robb acknowledged drinking champagne and having a nude massage with Miss Virginia Tai Collins. Although he denied having an affair, Robb admitted to an "indiscreet friendship." Collins claimed it was an 18-month affair. Soon after, Collins appeared nude in Playboy. (1991)
 Brock Adams, Senator (Democrat-Washington) — In 1992, was accused by eight women of committing acts of sexual misconduct, ranging from sexual harassment to rape. Adams denied the accusations, there was no criminal prosecution, and he did not run for re-election.
 Robert Packwood, Senator (Republican-Oregon) — Resigned his office in 1995, after 29 women came forward with claims of sexual harassment, abuse, and assaults. His denials of any wrongdoing were eventually contradicted by his own diaries boasting of his sexual conquests.
 Ken Calvert, Representative (Republican-California) — was involved with a prostitute in 1993, but claimed that no money was involved, and he was not arrested. Calvert apologized several months later: “My conduct that evening was inappropriate.... it violated the values of the person I strive to be.”
 Helen Chenoweth-Hage, Representative (Republican-Idaho) — called for the resignation of Bill Clinton, and then admitted in 1998 to having had a six-year affair with a married rancher before she entered government. Chenoweth said: "Fourteen years ago, when I was a private citizen and a single woman, I was involved in a relationship that I came to regret, that I'm not proud of.... I only wish I could have learned the lessons sooner."
 Bob Barr, Representative (Republican-Georgia) — had an affair while married to his second wife. Barr was the first lawmaker in either chamber to call for Clinton's resignation due to the Lewinsky scandal. Barr lost a primary challenge less than three years after the impeachment proceedings (1999).
 Dan Burton, Representative (Republican-Indiana) — In 1995, speaking of the then-recent affairs of Republican Robert Packwood and the unfolding affair of Democrat Bill Clinton, Burton stated: “No one, regardless of what party they serve, no one, regardless of what branch of government they serve, should be allowed to get away with these alleged sexual improprieties....” In 1998, Vanity Fair printed an article detailing an affair which Burton himself had in 1983 which produced a child. Before publication, Burton admitted to fathering a son with a former state employee.
 Robert Livingston, Representative (Republican-Louisiana) — called for the resignation of Bill Clinton in 1998, and when his own extramarital affairs were leaked, his wife pressed him to resign, and for Livingston to urge Clinton to do likewise.
 Newt Gingrich, Representative (Republican-Georgia) and leader of the Republican Revolution of 1994 — Resigned from the House after admitting in 1998 to having had an affair with a staffer while he was married to his second wife, and at the same time he was leading the impeachment of Bill Clinton for perjury regarding an affair with his intern Monica Lewinsky.
 Henry Hyde, Representative (Republican-Illinois) — In 1998, Salon.com stated that from 1965 to 1969 (before Hyde won federal office), he conducted an extramarital sexual affair with a married woman who had three children from her marriage. Hyde, who was 41 years old and married when the affair occurred, admitted to the affair in 1998, describing the relationship as a “youthful indiscretion.” The revelation of this affair took place as Hyde was spearheading the impeachment hearings of President Bill Clinton over the Monica Lewinsky scandal.
 Pete Domenici, Senator (Republican-New Mexico) — voted for the impeachment of President Bill Clinton in 1998 after his affair with Monica Lewinsky. In 2013, he confessed that in 1978, he fathered a son, Adam Laxalt, outside of his marriage; Adam Laxalt's mother is Michelle Laxalt, the daughter of Senator Paul Laxalt, and a prominent Republican lobbyist.
 Bill Clinton (Democrat), the 42nd President of the United States — Revelations that White House intern Monica Lewinsky had oral sex with Clinton in the Oval Office led him to famously declare on TV on January 26, 1998: “I did not have sexual relations with that woman, Miss Lewinsky.” The scandal led to impeachment by the House for perjury, for lying about the affair under oath. He was acquitted in the Senate, with 55 senators voting Not Guilty, to 45 senators voting Guilty (falling 22 votes short of the two-thirds necessary to convict). Clinton's law license was suspended by the state of Arkansas for five years. In 1998, Clinton admitted to an extramarital affair with Gennifer Flowers.
 Mel Reynolds, Representative (Democrat-Illinois) — resigned from Congress in 1995 after a conviction for statutory rape. In August 1994, he was indicted for sexual assault and criminal sexual abuse for engaging in a sexual relationship with a 16-year-old campaign volunteer that began during the 1992 campaign. Despite the charges, he continued his campaign, and was re-elected that November; he had no opposition. Reynolds initially denied the charges, which he claimed were racially motivated. On August 22, 1995, he was convicted on 12 counts of sexual assault, obstruction of justice, and solicitation of child pornography. He resigned his seat on October 1 of that year.

2000–2009
 Gary Condit, Representative (Democrat-California) — His affair with 23-year-old intern Chandra Levy was exposed after Levy disappeared. Her body was found a year later, and in 2008, an illegal immigrant with no relation to Condit was charged with her murder, but all charges against the suspect were dropped years later. The murder of Chandra Levy remains unsolved. Condit had often demanded that Bill Clinton "come clean" about his affair with Monica Lewinsky. (2001)
 Ed Schrock, Representative (Republican-Virginia) — Announced he would terminate his 2004 attempt for a third term in Congress after allegedly being caught on tape soliciting sex with men, despite having aggressively opposed various gay-rights issues in Congress, such as same-sex marriage and gays in the military.
 Strom Thurmond, Senator before 1964 (Democrat-South Carolina), after 1964 (Republican-South Carolina) — Despite being a noted segregationist, Thurmond fathered a child, Essie Mae Washington-Williams, with a 16-year-old African American in 1925, who was employed by the Thurmond family. (2003)
 Steven C. LaTourette, Representative (Republican-Ohio) — was elected in 1994, and had voted to impeach Bill Clinton for the Lewinsky scandal. He himself had a long-term affair with his chief of staff, Jennifer Laptook, while he was married. He married Laptook after his divorce. (2003)
 Don Sherwood, Representative (Republican-Pennsylvania) — failed to win re-election following revelations of a five-year extramarital affair with Cynthia Ore, who accused him of physically abusing her. (2004)
Jeff Gannon — A conservative blogger who did not qualify for a legitimate press pass, but was routinely allowed to ask “softball” questions at White House press conferences. Further scrutiny revealed that Gannon had posted naked pictures of himself on multiple male escort websites. (2005)
 Mark Foley, Representative (Republican-Florida) — Resigned his House seat when accused of sending sexually explicit e-mails to teenage male congressional pages. He was replaced by Tim Mahoney. (2006)
 Jim Gibbons, Representative (Republican-Nevada) — was campaigning for Governor when he walked waitress Chrissy Mazzeo to her car. She claimed he threw her against a wall, and threatened to sexually assault her. He claimed she tripped and he caught her.  The civil lawsuit was settled with the payment of $50,000 to Mazzeo. Six weeks later, he was elected governor.
 David Vitter, Senator (Republican-Louisiana) — Took over the House seat of former Congressman Robert Livingston, who resigned in 1999, following revelations of an extramarital affair. At the time, Vitter stated, “I think Livingston's stepping down makes a very powerful argument that (Bill) Clinton should resign as well....” Vitter's name was then discovered in the address book of Deborah Jeane Palfrey (the "D.C. Madam"). (2007)
 Randall L. Tobias (Republican), Deputy Secretary of State and former "AIDS Czar" appointed by George W. Bush — Stated that U.S. funds should be denied to countries that permitted prostitution. He resigned on April 27, 2007, after confirming that he had been a customer of Deborah Jeane Palfrey (the "D.C. Madam").
 Larry Craig (Republican-Idaho), a U.S. Senator for 18 years — was arrested on June 11, 2007, and charged with lewd conduct arising from his behavior in a men's restroom at the Minneapolis–Saint Paul International Airport. Craig pleaded guilty to the lesser charge of disorderly conduct; he later unsuccessfully sought to withdraw his guilty plea. He announced his resignation three months later on September 1, 2007, but changed his mind again, although he did not seek re-election in 2008. (2007)
 Tim Mahoney, Representative (Democrat-Florida) — was elected to the seat of Mark Foley, who had resigned following sexual harassment charges from his congressional interns. Mahoney ran on a campaign promise to make “a world that is safer, more moral.” In October 2008, he admitted he placed his mistress on his staff and then fired her, saying, “You work at my pleasure.” He then admitted to multiple other affairs.
 Vito Fossella, Representative (Republican-New York) — was arrested for drunken driving. Under questioning, the married Congressman and father of three admitted to an affair with Laura Fay that produced a daughter. (2008)
 John Edwards, Senator (Democrat-North Carolina) — Admitted to an extramarital affair with actress and film producer Rielle Hunter, which produced a child, seriously undercutting his 2008 presidential campaign.
 John Ensign, Senator (Republican-Nevada) — Resigned his position as chairman of the Senate Republican Policy Committee on June 16, 2009, after admitting he had an affair with the wife of a close friend, both of whom were working on his campaign. Under investigation, he then resigned his Senate seat 20 months early in 2011. In 1998, Senator Ensign had called for President Bill Clinton (Democrat) to resign after admitting to sexual acts with Monica Lewinsky. (2009)
 Chip Pickering, Representative (Republican-Mississippi) — On July 16, 2009, it was announced that his wife had filed an alienation of affection lawsuit against a woman with whom Chip allegedly had an affair. The lawsuit claimed the adulterous relationship ruined the Pickerings' marriage and his political career. (2009)
 Mark Sanford, Governor (Republican-South Carolina) — In June 2009, after having disappeared from the state for nearly a week, Sanford publicly revealed that he had engaged in an extramarital affair. Sanford had led his staff to believe that he was going hiking on the Appalachian Trail, but actually went to visit his mistress, Maria Belén Chapur, in Argentina. While the scandal made national headlines, led to his censure by the South Carolina General Assembly, and led to his resignation as chair of the Republican Governors Association, Sanford did complete his second term as governor.

2010–2019 

 Jack Tarpley Camp Jr., (R) Judge of the U.S. District Court for the North District of Georgia — Pleaded guilty to aiding and abetting a felon's possession of a controlled substance, and to two misdemeanors: illegally giving a stripper his government-issued laptop, and possession of illegal drugs. He was sentenced to 30 days in jail, 400 hours of community service, and resignation from the bench. (2010)
 Eric Massa, Representative (Democrat-New York) — Resigned to avoid an ethics investigation into his admitted groping and tickling of multiple male staffers. He later stated on Fox News: “not only did I grope [a staffer], I tickled him until he couldn't breathe…” (2010)
 Mark Souder, Representative (Republican-Indiana) — A staunch advocate of abstinence and family values, Souder resigned to avoid an ethics investigation into his admitted extramarital affair with a female staffer. (2010)
 Chris Lee, Representative (Republican-New York) — Resigned hours after a news report stated that he had sent a shirtless picture of himself flexing his muscles to a woman via Craigslist, along with flirtatious e-mails. He did not rely on a pseudonym or a false e-mail address, but used his official Congressional e-mail for all communication. Lee said: “I regret the harm that my actions have caused my family, my staff, and my constituents.... I have made profound mistakes, and I promise to work as hard as I can to seek their forgiveness.” (2011)
 Anthony Weiner, Representative (Democrat-New York) — Admitted to sending sexually-explicit photos of himself to several women through his Twitter account. He resigned from Congress on June 16, 2011, but kept sexting after his resignation. (2011) On November 6, 2017, Weiner began serving a 21-month sentence for sexting a 15-year-old girl.
 Scott DesJarlais, Representative (Republican-Tennessee) — Admitted under oath to at least six affairs, including two affairs with his patients and staffers while he was a physician at Grandview Medical Center in Jasper, TN. Additionally, while running on a declared "pro-life" (anti-abortion) platform, DesJarlais coerced his ex-wife into having two abortions, and tried to persuade a mistress, who was his patient, into an abortion as well.
 David Wu, Representative (Democrat-Oregon) — On July 26, 2011, Wu resigned from the House of Representatives, after being accused of making unwanted sexual advances toward a fundraiser's daughter.
 Vance McAllister, Representative (Republican-Louisiana) — Although married and the father of five, was caught on surveillance camera deeply kissing a married staffer. Several prominent Republicans asked McAllister to resign. In response, he stated he would not seek re-election in 2016. McCallister said: “There's no doubt I've fallen short, and I'm asking for forgiveness. I'm asking for forgiveness from God, my wife, my kids, my staff, and my constituents who elected me to serve.” (2014)
 Blake Farenthold, Representative (Republican-Texas) — was reported to have paid $84,000 of taxpayer money, via the House of Representatives Office of Compliance, to settle a sexual harassment complaint from a former staffer. Farenthold's former communications director, Lauren Greene, sued the congressman in December 2014, and a settlement was reached in 2015. The identity of Farenthold with respect to taxpayer involvement was made public in 2017. This was the first documented case of taxpayer funds being used to settle sexual harassment complaints against a member of Congress. (2014)           
 Dennis Hastert, former Speaker of the United States House of Representatives (Republican-Illinois) — Pled guilty to structuring bank withdrawals in order to conceal deliberately-unspecified misconduct by Hastert against an unnamed individual years earlier. At a sentencing hearing in October 2015, Hastert admitted that he had sexually abused boys while he worked as a high school wrestling coach decades earlier. (2015)
 Donald Trump (Republican), the 45th President of the United States — was accused of sexual assault by 25 women during the 2016 election, and he denied the allegations. (See Donald Trump sexual misconduct allegations.) The allegations arose after The Washington Post released a 2005 video of Trump, recorded on a hot microphone by Access Hollywood, in which he allegedly bragged about groping women. Trump himself renewed the controversy a year later by alleging that the video was fake, to which Access Hollywood replied: “Let us make this perfectly clear—the tape is very real. Remember, his excuse at the time was 'locker-room talk.' He said every one of those words.” The first reports of an alleged 2006 affair between Donald Trump and adult film star Stormy Daniels were published in October 2011 by the blog The Dirty and the magazine Life & Style (see Stormy Daniels–Donald Trump scandal).
 Tim Murphy, Representative (Republican-Pennsylvania) — Had an extramarital affair with Shannon Edwards, a 32-year-old forensic psychologist. The self-identified "pro-life" (anti-abortion) Murphy asked Edwards to have an abortion after she became pregnant. The information was revealed as part of Edwards's divorce proceedings, and published by the Pittsburgh Post-Gazette after it fought in Pennsylvania state court to have the documents unsealed. Murphy resigned his seat in Congress.
 Al Franken, Senator (Democrat-Minnesota) — was accused by radio newscaster Leeann Tweeden of forcibly kissing her as part of a skit, and later being in a photo pretending to grope her without consent during a U.S.O. tour in 2006. Tweeden produced photo evidence of the pretend grope, taken of Franken when Tweeden was asleep. Franken admitted to the allegations, apologized for his actions, and then resigned.
 Joe Barton, Representative (Republican-Texas) — Acknowledged he took and emailed nude photos of himself in 2015, following leaks of the photos in November 2017. He decided not to seek re-election in 2018.
 John Conyers Jr., US Congressman (Democrat-Michigan) — A former staffer for Rep. John Conyers Jr. accused the Detroit Democrat of unwanted sexual advances in 2017. A woman who had settled a sexual harassment claim against him stated that the lawmaker had "violated" her body, repeatedly propositioned her for sex, and asked her to touch his genitals. He then resigned.
 Trent Franks, Representative (Republican-Arizona) — was investigated by the House Ethics Commission about allegations of improper conduct. Before the study concluded, Franks abruptly resigned. (2017)
 Pat Meehan, Representative (Republican-Pennsylvania) — In January, 2018, it was revealed that US Representative Pat Meehan used taxpayer funds to settle a sexual harassment claim levied by a female staffer. He was removed from the House Ethics Committee, but remained in office until he resigned on April 27, 2018, stating that he would repay the taxpayer money used to settle the suit. (2018)
Jim Jordan, Representative (Republican-Ohio) — was accused of covering up and failing to report sexual abuse of minors by former members of the Ohio State University wrestling team by the team physician. There were multiple victims during the period when Jordan was Assistant Coach of the team from 1987 to 1995. On February 12, 2020, allegations surfaced from one of those former members that Jordan (was) "repeatedly crying and begging him not to corroborate accounts of sexual abuse against the university’s wrestling team doctor that occurred when Jordan was a coach."
 Roy S. Moore, Republican candidate for the US Senate — was accused by nine women of sexual contact and assault in the 1980s, when the women were teenaged girls. Though Moore denied the allegations, he lost the election. (2017)
 Tony Tooke, Chief of the US Forest Service, resigned after a series of sexual harassment and retaliation accusations. (2018)
 Alex Kozinski (R) US Judge in the Ninth Circuit Court of Appeals appointed by Republican Ronald Reagan, retired following allegations of sexual misconduct from several women, including former clerks. (2018)
 Katie Hill, Representative (Democrat-California) — In October 2019, news reports indicated that she was being investigated by the House Ethics Commission about allegations of sexual relationships with a subordinate. Hill was alleged to have engaged in an extramarital affair with her male legislative director, Graham Kelly, as well as a 22 year old female staffer. She would later resign as a result of the allegations and subsequent investigation.

2020–2022 
Madison Cawthorn, Representative (Republican-North Carolina) — In August 2020, during Cawthorn's campaign for Congress, several women accused him of sexually aggressive behavior, sexual misconduct, and sexual assault. These allegations arose once more in February 2021 after a BuzzFeed News investigation found 20 people who said that Cawthorn had harassed his female classmates during college; the reporters spoke to four women who said he had harassed them. It was alleged that Cawthorn often recklessly drove women in his car to remote areas off campus while asking them sexual questions: he reportedly called these journeys "fun drives". Two resident assistants said they warned women to avoid Cawthorn and not to ride in his car. A male acquaintance said Cawthorn bragged about pulling a woman into his lap and putting a finger between her legs. On May 4, 2022, a sex tape of Cawthorn began circulating online. The video shows a naked Cawthorn, in bed with another man, thrusting his genitals in the man's face. Cawthorn acknowledged the film's veracity, but said the video was made "years ago" when he was "being crass with a friend."
Cal Cunningham, Democratic candidate for the US Senate — In October 2020, it was leaked that he had sent sexually suggestive text messages to a married California woman. This played a role in Cunningham losing the 2020 United States Senate election in North Carolina to incumbent Thom Tillis.

Matt Gaetz, Representative (Republican-Florida) — In March 2021, reports surfaced of a federal investigation into allegations that Gaetz had a sexual relationship with a 17-year-old girl in 2019. The New York Times reported that Gaetz was being investigated by the Department of Justice (DOJ), and investigators were examining whether he had violated federal sex trafficking laws. Gaetz denied any wrongdoing, asserting he and his family were "victims of an organized criminal extortion involving a former DOJ official seeking $25 million." As of 2022, Gaetz has not been charged.

Tom Reed, Representative (Republican-New York), was accused of sexual harassment on March 19, 2021, by a lobbyist for an incident at a bar. In a statement made on March 21, 2021, he apologized to her and said he would not seek re-election in 2022. On May 10, 2022, he announced his resignation on the House floor effective immediately.

Van Taylor, Representative (Republican-Texas) — In February 2022, days before the primary election in Texas, counter-extremism activist Tania Joya claimed that she and Taylor had an extramarital sexual affair in 2020 and 2021. Her allegations were circulated by the media. Taylor won a plurality but not a majority in the primary, and faced a runoff election, but suspended his campaign. He formally withdrew from the runoff days later.

See also
 List of federal political scandals in the United States
 Newport sex scandal, involving behavior by U.S. Navy sailors in 1919
 2017–18 United States political sexual scandals
Federal politicians:
 Donald Trump sexual misconduct allegations
 Bill Clinton sexual misconduct allegations
 List of American federal politicians convicted of crimes
 List of United States senators expelled or censured
 List of United States representatives expelled, censured, or reprimanded

State and local politics:
 List of American state and local politicians convicted of crimes

Notes

 
United States sex
Scandals